Bowling took place for the men's and women's individual, doubles, trios, and team events at the 2005 West Asian Games in Doha, Qatar from December 4 to December 9. All events were held at the Qatar Bowling Center.

Medalists

Men

Women

Medal table

References

 Results at ABF Website

External links
Bowling Digital

2005 West Asian Games
West Asian Games
2005 West Asian Games
2005 West Asian Games